Feidong railway station is a railway station in Feidong County, Hefei, Anhui, China.

The planned Hefei Metro line 2 eastern extension will interchange with this station.

History 
Feidong railway station was built with the Hefei–Nanjing railway. The line opened on 18 April 2008 however the intermediate stations, including Feidong, did not open until 1 May.

Passenger service was suspended from 16 April 2017 to allow the station to be rebuilt.

On 28 June 2020 the station reopened with the second phase of the Shangqiu–Hangzhou high-speed railway.

References 

Railway stations in Anhui
Railway stations in China opened in 2008